Shia Islam  constitutes a significant minority in Kuwait. In 2001, the US Department of State reported that there were 300,000 Shia Kuwaiti citizens and 820,000 Kuwaiti citizens in total thus Shias formed 36.5% of the Kuwaiti citizen population. In 2002, the US Department of State reported that Shia Kuwaitis formed 30-40% of Kuwait's citizen population, noting there were 525,000 Sunni citizens and 855,000 Kuwaiti citizens in total (61% Sunnis, 39% Shias). In 2004, there were 300,000-350,000 Shia Kuwaiti citizens and 913,000 Kuwaiti citizens in total. The Strategic Studies Institute reported that they constitute 40% of the population in 2008.

Contrary to the expectations of the Iraqi government, Shia Kuwaitis founded the local armed resistance movement during Saddam Hussein's occupation of Kuwait in the Gulf War. Most Kuwaitis arrested, tortured and executed during the occupation bore Shia names. The Kuwaiti resistance's casualty rate far exceeded that of the coalition military forces and Western hostages. The resistance predominantly consisted of ordinary citizens who lacked any form of training and supervision. 

The Shia Kuwaiti community has produced a number of well-known individuals, notable in many fields, especially business and commerce, thus contributing significantly to the general economic development of the country. Kuwait's first female minister Massouma al-Mubarak is a Shia. One of the first women elected in the parliament, Rola Dashti, is a Kuwaiti Shia. Most Shia Kuwaitis are of Iranian ancestry. Shiites are under-represented in the National Assembly. Shia citizens as a group are integrated into the Kuwaiti state. Kuwaiti government policy, on paper, allegedly does not discriminate citizens on a sectarian basis.

See also
 'Ajam of Kuwait
 Imam Baqir Mosque
 Imam Hussein Mosque (Kuwait)
 Baharna in Kuwait

References

Islam in Kuwait
Kuwait